Francis Charteris may refer to:

Francis Charteris (rake) (1672–1732), famous rake, nicknamed "The Rape-Master General"
Francis Charteris, 7th Earl of Wemyss (1723–1808), grandson who adopted his grandfather's surname on inheriting his estates
Francis Charteris, Lord Elcho (1749–1808), British Member of Parliament for Haddington Burghs, 1780–1787
Francis Wemyss Charteris Douglas, 8th Earl of Wemyss (1772–1853) (better known as Francis Douglas), grandson of the 7th Earl
Francis Wemyss-Charteris, 9th Earl of Wemyss (1796–1883), son of the 8th Earl
Francis Charteris, 10th Earl of Wemyss (1818–1914), son of the 9th Earl
Francis David Charteris, 12th Earl of Wemyss (1912–2008) (better known as David Charteris), grandson of the 11th Earl